Thurstonland and Farnley Tyas was an urban district in the West Riding of Yorkshire from 1925 to 1938.

It was created in 1925 by the merger of the Thurstonland and Farnley Tyas urban districts (both created in 1894).  In 1938 it was itself abolished, under a County Review Order, with most going to Kirkburton urban district, and part to Holmfirth Urban District.  The area now forms part of the Kirklees metropolitan borough in West Yorkshire.

References

Urban districts of England
Local government in Kirklees